Fitz is a prefix to patronymic surnames of Anglo-Norman origin.

Fitz may also refer to:

People 
 Fitz (surname), a list of people so named
 Fitz (given name), a list of people with the given name or nickname

Fictional characters 
 Dr. Edward "Fitz" Fitzgerald, protagonist in the UK TV series Cracker
 FitzChivalry Farseer, known informally as "Fitz", a character in Robin Hobb's Farseer Trilogy
 Percy Fitzwallace, known informally as "Fitz", from the TV series The West Wing
 Fitzgerald Grant, called Fitz, fictional President of the United States in Scandal
 Isaac Prophet Fitzpatrick, a main character in the novel Fitzpatrick's War
 Fitz Kreiner, a companion of the eighth Doctor Who in the "Eighth Doctor Adventures" novels
 Mark "Fitz" Fitzgerald, on Degrassi: The Next Generation
 Leo Fitz, in Marvel Comics and later main character of the TV series Agents of S.H.I.E.L.D.
 Richard "Fitz" Fitzpatrick, protagonist of the Canadian TV series Call Me Fitz, played by Jason Priestley
 Fitz, original name of the cartoon character Bimbo (Fleischer Studios)

Places 
 Fitz, Shropshire, a small village in England
 Fitz Park, a public park in Keswick, Cumbria
 Fitzwilliam College, Cambridge, commonly abbreviated "Fitz", a constituent college of the University of Cambridge

TV series 
 Cracker (U.S. TV series) (broadcast as Fitz in several countries), the American remake of Cracker
 The Fitz, a short-lived British sitcom

Other uses 
 Fitz's root beer
 Fitz and the Tantrums, an American pop band
 Fitz Casino & Hotel, a casino in Las Vegas, Nevada, now called The D Las Vegas
 Fitz Motorsports and Fitz Racing, American NASCAR
 Fitz Manor, a manor house and hotel in Montford Bridge, Shropshire, England

See also 

 Old Fitzgerald or "Old Fitz", a brand of bourbon
 
 Pfitz (disambiguation)